Roskorwell is a hamlet in Cornwall, England, United Kingdom. It lies just north of Porthallow in the civil parish of St Keverne.

The name Roskorwell comes from the Cornish language words ros, meaning 'hill-spur', and Korvil, a personal name.

References

Hamlets in Cornwall
St Keverne